Rachilla may refer to the following topics in botany:
 Rachilla (floral axis), the part of the spikelet that bears the florets in grasses and sedges
 Rachilla (rachis), a secondary rachis in leaves that are compound more than once